Yunohamella is a genus of comb-footed spiders (family Theridiidae) that was first described by H. Yoshida in 2007.

Species
, the World Spider Catalog accepted eight species, found in Asia, Europe, and North America:
Yunohamella gibbosa Gao & Li, 2014 – China
Yunohamella lyrica (Walckenaer, 1841) – North America, Korea, Japan
Yunohamella palmgreni (Marusik & Tsellarius, 1986) – Finland, Poland, Estonia, Russia (Europe to W-Siberia)
Yunohamella serpatusa (Guan & Zhu, 1993) – Russia (Urals to Far East), China, Korea
Yunohamella subadulta (Bösenberg & Strand, 1906) – Russia (Far East), Korea, Japan
Yunohamella takasukai Yoshida, 2012 – Indonesia (Java)
Yunohamella varietas Lee & Kim, 2021 – South Korea (Ulsan)
Yunohamella yunohamensis (Bösenberg & Strand, 1906) (type) – Russia (Sakhalin, Kurile Is.), Korea, Japan

In synonymy:
Y. kentuckyensis (Keyserling, 1884) = Yunohamella lyrica (Walckenaer, 1841)
Y. tigrae (Esyunin & Efimik, 1996) = Yunohamella serpatusa (Guan & Zhu, 1993)

See also
 List of Theridiidae species

References

Further reading

Araneomorphae genera
Holarctic spiders
Spiders of Asia
Spiders of Russia
Theridiidae